Iceland competed at the 2022 Winter Olympics in Beijing, China, from 4 to 20 February 2022.

The Icelandic team consisted of three men and two women competing in two sports. Kristrún Guðnadóttir and Sturla Snær Snorrason were the country's flagbearer during the opening ceremony. Meanwhile cross-country skier Snorri Einarsson was the flagbearer during the closing ceremony.

Their best placement was 19th, in men's team sprint.

Competitors
The following is the list of number of competitors participating at the Games per sport/discipline.

Alpine skiing

By meeting the basic qualification standards Iceland qualified one male and one female alpine skier.

Cross-country skiing

Iceland qualified two male and one female cross-country skier. The Icelandic Olympic Committee selected Snorri Einarsson, Kristrún Guðnadóttir and Isak Stianson Pedersen.

Distance

Sprint

References

Nations at the 2022 Winter Olympics
2022
Winter Olympics